General elections were held in the Seychelles between 20 and 23 July 1993 following the approval of a new constitution in a referendum on 18 June. They were the first-ever multi-party elections for President and the first multi-party election for the National Assembly since 1974. The Assembly was increased from 22 to 33 seats by the addition of 11 seats to be elected by proportional representation in addition to the 22 constituency seats.

The ruling Seychelles People's Progressive Front, which had previously been the sole legal party, won both elections, taking 27 of the 33 seats in the National Assembly, whilst its leader, France-Albert René, won the presidential election. The other two parties to contest the election were the Seychelles Democratic Party, which won five seats, and the United Opposition, an alliance of the Seselwa Party, the Seychelles National Party and the National Alliance Party), which won one. Voter turnout was 86.5%.

Results

President

National Assembly

References

1993 in Seychelles
Elections in Seychelles
Seychelles
Presidential elections in Seychelles
July 1993 events in Africa